Dinosaur Island is a 1994 B-movie directed by Fred Olen Ray and Jim Wynorski. Wynorski called it "a very 1950's type of picture, like The Lost Continent except that we're going to have better dinosaurs and more girls."

Plot
An U.S. Army captain is flying three misfit deserters home for a court martial when the airplane has engine trouble and they crash-land in the ocean near an uncharted island. There they find a primitive society of cave women who routinely sacrifice virgins to appease The Great One, the top-dog dinosaur on the island. Mistaken for gods as part of a prophecy, the men must destroy The Great One or face death, but meanwhile they fall in love despite the advice of their Queen, who tries to dissuade them from being corrupted by the outsiders' ways.

Cast

Production
Wynorski said that Roger Corman asked him and Fred Olen Ray to make the film after Jurassic Park came out. "It wasn't so much a Jurassic Park rip off as a cavewoman movie", Wynorski said.

Wynorski and Ray said they rewrote the script entirely. They knew who they were going to cast, employing actors they had worked with before, and tailored the script accordingly. They based the characters of the soldiers on characters in Stripes. Another influence was The War that Time Forgot, part of the Star Spangled War Stories comic book series.

The movie was shot at Vasquez Rocks and David Carradine's ranch at Sun Valley over ten days. Wynorski says he and Ray made it "on a wing and a prayer". 

Several of the dinosaur props, namely the Deinonychus pet of the tribe and the antagonistic Great One were reused and refurbished from the previous year's film, Carnosaur, which Corman had produced.

Wynorski later said, "I'd never co-directed a movie before, but it was smooth sailing all the way. When one of us got tired, the other would take over. I'd usually go back to the comfort of the air-conditioned motor home and hang out with the girls. You really can't beat that."

Reception
"Roger ended up hating the movie," said Wynorski. "He didn't think the girls in it were pretty and he thought the story was too campy. But it did really well." The film performed better on television than on video.

Wynorski says he was at a party when he met Joe Pesci who told him he loved the film, saying "everytime I watch it I feel like I want to go there."

References

External links

 
 

1990s American films
1990s science fiction adventure films
1990s science fiction thriller films
American science fiction thriller films
American science fiction adventure films
1990s English-language films
1994 films
Films about dinosaurs
Films directed by Fred Olen Ray
Films directed by Jim Wynorski
Films set on islands
Films set in Oceania